Paul "Play" Dairo is a Nigerian musician, singer, and songwriter. He is best known for his songs "Angel Of My Life," "Forever," and "You and Me." In 1999, under the music label Kennis Music, he produced a remix of the song "Mo So Rire." Dairo has won several music awards, including The Headies' Artist of The Year award.

Biography
Dairo is the son of the late Nigerian singer I.K. Dairo
He signed with Kennis Music in 1999 after his music group, Oxygen broke up.
He left Kennis Music in the mid-2000s after the release of two successful albums Dairo Music Foundation project 1 and project2- 2 Ways 2 Play. Paul went on to record his third album titled Paul I.k.Daito-No.1 which includes hit songs like playground Party, Salome, and African n Proud.His fourth album Hitsville was a game-changer. the album was critically acclaimed and the most successful purely R&B Album to date, selling over 3 million cop
The former president of the Federal Republic of Nigeria, Chief Olusegun Obasanjo and first lady Chief Mrs. Stella Obasanjo are great lovers of Paul's music. He has performed for the first family on Nigeria's 40th Independence at the Aso Rock in the federal capital territory. His music is embraced by the masses, the elite class as well as Govt officials. His performance is rated first-class at high brow events and he has also performed with international acts at major events. They include; Joe, Brandy, Sean Paul and ShaggySisqoDonnel Jones, SWV, Betty Wright, Chaka Khan, 112, Kenny Lattimore, Chante Moore just to mention a few.Paul has worked with great producers and A&R in U.K. and U.S.A., after listening to "sacrifice" (song on the second alum) He was contacted through his partner Denitty by the management of Jimmy Cozier to write songs for his album. His works marveled at the entire production team of a U.K. Management Company Starview Entertainment he was invited for a Producer/artiste deal in 2003. Paul left Kennis Music in 2002 to set up his own record label, Playground Entertainment. Paul released his fifth album "Hero" in 2010 after he went through a life-threatening ordeal while shooting a music video in South Africa. He fell ill shortly after shooting the video for "delicious " one of the tracks on the album. he was rushed to Arwyp medical center in South Africa where he was diagnosed with a Kidney Tumor. The surgery was successful but took a toll on his music career. due to his health situation, Paul went off the radar for four years. Although he was absent from the mainstream music scene, he pushed through the moment by taking up the reality judge role in starquest, A Nigerian Talent reality Tv show for three consecutive years.in 2016, Paul released a single titled "fool in love", which got good reviews from music critics and ardent fans. in 2020 Paul, released "Angel of my life " remake featuring Runtownand the current hit song "Kolo" featuring Nonso Amadi The singles revamped Paul's prominence in the music industry. in 2021, he organized his first concert in the UK in a long time in Northampton.The concert was successful as his ardent fans came out in large numbers to support him. He later did three other gigs in Belfast and London venues. Paul is surely a chip of the old block, following his father's footsteps and keeping the legacy alive.

Discography
Studio albums
Dairo Music Foundation Project 1 (1999)
Project2 (2002)
No.1 (2004)
Hitaville (2005)
Hero (2010)

Singles
Renegade(2014)
Best Thing (2014)
Fool In Love (2016)
Tell It To Me(2016)
Kolo (2020)
 Angel Of Moy Life (remake 2020)
 Guidance  (2020)

Awards
'xMnet (South Africa ) where u @ Award fro best Male artist (200)Fame Awards Best Vocalist(2000)Amen Awards Best Song (Mosorire)   (2000)Nigerian Song Festival Song Of The Year(Mosorire) (2000)Teen Favorite Award  (2001)N.A.C.A.Y.O.N Best Artist Of The Year  (2001) Fame Music Awards Best Gospel Artist (2002)AMEN Awards Best Gospel Artist 2002ONEAL Awards Best Artist Of The Year (2002)Headies Awards Best R&B Album Of The Year (2007)Headies Award Best Artist Of The Year (2007)Headies Award Best Recording Of The Year (2007)Headies Best Album Of The Year (2007)AMEN Awards Best Vocalist Of The Year (2007)
 AMEN Awards BestR&B Album Of The Year (2007)AMEN Awards Best R&B Vocals Of The Year (2007)AMEN Awards Best R&B Song Of The Year'' (2007)

References

Nigerian male musicians
Living people
Nigerian hip hop singers
The Headies winners
Year of birth missing (living people)
Nigerian male singers
Nigerian songwriters